The term Battle of the Wabash has been used to refer to significant battles on or near the Wabash River.  History records several known battles along the river.

Battle of Vincennes (1779)
Harmar's Defeat (1790)
St. Clair's Defeat (1791) is alternatively referred to as the Battle of the Wabash.
The Attack on Fort Recovery (1794) occurred on the same location as St. Clair's Defeat.
The Battle of Tippecanoe (1811) has been referred to as the Battle of the Wabash.
Siege of Fort Harrison (1812)
Siege of Fort Wayne (1812)

1779-related lists
1790 in the United States
Wabash County, Illinois
Fort Wayne, Indiana
1812-related lists